Zakaria Hawsawi (born 12 January 2001) is a Saudi Arabian professional footballer who plays as a left back for Al-Ittihad on loan from Ohod.

Club career
Hawsawi started his career at the youth teams of Ohod. He made his first team debut for Ohod on 31 March 2021 in the 3–2 win against Al-Nahda. On 28 July 2021, Hawsawi signed his first professional contract with Ohod. On 6 July 2022, Hawsawi joined Pro League side Al-Ittihad on a one-year loan. He made his debut for Al-Ittihad on 15 September 2022 in the 2–0 win against Al-Khaleej.

International career
Hawsawi earned his first call-up for the Saudi Arabia U23 national team during the 2021 Islamic Solidarity Games. He made 4 appearances throughout the competition as the Green Falcons finished in second place, earning a silver medal.

On 31 October 2022, Hawsawi was called up to the senior Saudi Arabia national team. He made his debut on 6 November 2022 in the friendly match against Iceland.

Career statistics

Club

Honours

Al-Ittihad
Saudi Super Cup: 2022

References

External links
 
 

Living people
2001 births
People from Medina
Association football fullbacks
Saudi Arabian footballers
Saudi Arabia youth international footballers
Saudi Arabia international footballers
Ohod Club players
Ittihad FC players
Saudi First Division League players
Saudi Professional League players